The 1977 Campeonato Paulista da Divisão Especial de Futebol Profissional was the 76th season of São Paulo's top professional football league. Corinthians won the championship by the 16th time and no teams were relegated.

Championship
The first phase of the championship was divided into two rounds, in which the nineteen teams of the championship were divided into four groups;five with five teams and one with four, with each team playing once against all other teams, and the best team of each group passing to the Semifinals. The champions of each round qualified to the Third round, along with the six best teams in the aggregate table. Wins by three goals' difference or more were worth an extra point.

In the Third round, the eight remaining teams would be divided into two groups of four, each team playing once against the teams of its own group and the other group, and the best teams of each group qualifying to the Finals.

First round

Group A

Group B

Group C

Group D

Semifinals

|}

Finals

|}

Second round

Group A

Group B

Group C

Group D

Semifinals

|}

Finals

|}

Aggregate table

Third round

Group E

Group F

Finals

|}

References

Campeonato Paulista seasons
Paulista